Salama da sugo, also known as salamina da sugo, is a particular salami made of pork typical of the province of Ferrara consumed after cooking. It is recognized with the IGP and DOP designations of origin.

History 
Cristoforo di Messisbugo, steward of Duke Alfonso I d'Este, in his work published posthumously in 1549 Banchetti composizioni di vivande e apparecchio generale indicates the general lines which can be the first citation of this preparation when he describes the way of making "mortadelle di carne" by using wine in the mixture of the sausage.

Preparation 

It is prepared by mincing various parts of the pig such as the neck, jowl, lean meat coming from the trimming of the thigh, destined for the production of ham and shoulder, a small percentage of tongue and liver is added, to which, in the contemporary recipe, salt, pepper and nutmeg are added. Homemade preparations of the product sometimes include, although rarely, the addition of other spices such as cloves and cinnamon, as a reference to the first known recipe of salamina, the one dating back to the eighteenth century by Don Domenico Chendi, parish priest of Tresigallo.

The curing of the mixture ends with the addition of a generous amount of robust, non-sweetened, unpasteurized red wine without added sulfites which, in addition to aromatizing the sausage, also characterizes the seasoning process, directing the formation of the typical flavor of salama da sugo. The mixture thus obtained is stuffed into the bladder of the pig itself, in a characteristic round shape. The type of binding allows for the formation of eight or sixteen slices depending on the size; after a few days of initial drying, the seasoning continues for about a year in suitable environments with a cellar climate.

Cooking 
The procedure for cooking according to tradition is quite laborious. A first check (the so-called "piombatura") involves immersing the salama in cold water. If it sinks like a lead, it means that it does not have any defects that have arisen during the aging process. If it tends to float, it means that during the aging process small air pockets have formed inside the salama which could have made it rancid.

The preparatory phase includes the immersion in lukewarm water for a whole night followed by washing under running water in order to remove the layer of mold due to the natural aging process. For cooking it is necessary to have a high pot in order to allow the salami to remain suspended and not to touch the bottom or the walls during the whole cooking process which can last from four to eight hours (the time depends on the percentage of fat in the original mixture and on the aging time, information obtained from the production process). In order to obtain this result it is necessary that the binding string is usually supported by a long wooden cooking spoon or ladle placed transversally on the edge of the pot. During cooking part of the fat comes out and the mixture reaches the right consistency and the most intense taste. Salama, as opposed to cotechino, should not be pierced before cooking.

With a fatter product, cooking is achieved in less time because the fat during aging reduces dehydration and the consequent weight loss (compared to a high quality salama obtained from leaner meat) therefore it remains softer and cooking is achieved faster. The seasoning also affects the duration of cooking. If it is longer, it is necessary to cook it for a longer time in order to compensate the previous loss of water. The long cooking phase gives the salama its pleasant consistency.

Long cooking is a critical phase and one that needs experience. Salama must always remain suspended and always covered by water, therefore it is fundamental to refill the pan with hot water when necessary. Even the duration of cooking must be evaluated by an expert person.

Pre-cooked salama da sugo 
In modern cooking the time to be dedicated to the preparation of food has decreased in respect to past times. Considering the difficulties of a traditional cooking, since many decades are in commerce at a local level packages of precooked salamina da sugo, just like it already happens, even though with a different territorial diffusion, for zampone Modena, cotechino, Stinco di maiale and other similar products.

Consumption 
Usually salama is consumed hot. It can be done by removing the upper part of the salama and extracting the meat with a spoon or by removing the whole skin and presenting it in a container suitable to collect the sauce which comes out during the cutting into slices or slices. The traditional side dish is mashed potatoes to which is added a spoonful of the red sauce which comes out during the cutting of the salami. Many other side dishes are possible but all less used. Because of its caloric content it could be consumed as a single dish, even though, in certain occasions, it is customary to include it in a complete meal which includes some of the most famous dishes of Ferrara's cuisine such as cappelletti, or desserts such as pampepato, tenerina, torta con tagliatelle or zuppa inglese.

Ferrara's tradition 
Salama da sugo has been part of Ferrara's culinary tradition for centuries. Riccardo Bacchelli in his Il mulino del Po (The Mill of the Po) mentions it twice. Renzo Ravenna, despite his Jewish faith was used to consume it, even if only once a year. The Este Jewish community, which has been present in Ferrara for centuries, has produced a kosher variant. Orio Vergani said he appreciated it thanks to Italo Balbo who, during his visits to Ferrara, let him know all the secrets of the city.

Festivals and events 
The "Sagra della salamina da sugo al cucchiaio" is held between the end of September and the beginning of October in Poggio Renatico, in Madonna Boschi.

The "Sagra della salama da sugo di Buonacompra" is held in the middle of July in Buonacompra. Always in Buonacompra, the "I giorni della salama da sugo I.G.P." is held in mid-October.

The "World Championship of Salama da sugo" is held in the second half of February in Fiscaglia, organized by the Cultural Center ANCeSCAO Il Volano, in Migliarino.

Acknowledgements 
Antonio Frizzi, historian and writer from Ferrara, in 1722 dedicated a poem to it: La Salameide.

Salama da sugo has been included in the list of traditional food products and an independent mention is given to the salama da sugo of Madonna dei Boschi.

On October 24, 2014, "Salama da Sugo" was entered in the register of protected geographical indications (PGI).

References

Bibliography

Related articles 

 Salame all’aglio
 Salame gentile
 Pancetta
 Strutto
 Lardo

External links 

 
 
 
 
Italian sausages
Fermented sausages